Forest Cove can refer to a place in the United States:

Forest Cove, Agoura Hills, California
A section of Kingwood, Houston, Texas